The Swedish Landrace goat breed from northern Sweden is used for the production of milk, which is used to make types of goat cheese.

See also
Landrace
Danish Landrace goat
Dutch Landrace goat
Finnish Landrace goat

Sources
Swedish Landrace Goat

Goat breeds
Dairy goat breeds
Goat breeds originating in Sweden